Serenelli is a surname. It may refer to:

Alessandro Serenelli (1882-1970), Italian, who in 1902 attempted to seduce a young girl named Maria Goretti stabbing her fatally. Goretti was later proclaimed a saint by the Roman Catholic Church.
Giancarlo Serenelli (born 1981), Venezuelan racing driver

See also
 Serenella

Italian-language surnames